A game is a recreational activity with a set of rules.

Game or games may also refer to:

People

People with the surname
 Abram Games (1914–1996, London), British graphic designer
 Philip Game (1876–1961), British military leader and Governor of New South Wales, Australia
 William Game (1853–1932), first batsman to score a century for Oxford against Cambridge

People with the stagename
 The Game (rapper) (born 1979), or Game, an American rapper
 Triple H (born 1969), professional wrestler who dubbed himself "The Game"

Animals
 Game (dog), a quality of fighting dogs that are selectively bred and trained to fight
 Game (hunting), any non-domesticated animal hunted for food or sport

Arts, entertainment, and media

Films
Game (1993 film), a Hindi film
Game (2002 film), a Tamil film
Game (2003 film), a Japanese film
Game (2006 film), a Telugu film
Game (2011 film), an action Hindi-language film
Game (2014 film), a Bengali film
Game (2016 film), a Kannada-language film
Games (film), a 1967 film starring James Caan

Literature
 Game (play), a 2015 British play by Mike Bartlett
  "Game", a short story by Donald Barthelme
Games, a 1967 novel by Hal Ellson

Music

Groups
 Ford & Lopatin, formerly known as Games, an American band

Albums
 G.A.M.E., a 2006 album by Game
 Game (KHM album)
 Game (Perfume album)
 Game (Flow album), 2004
 Game (Nikolay Baskov album), 2016
 Games (Leo Ku album), 2003
 Games (University of Northern Iowa Jazz Band One album)
 Game, an album by Piano Squall
 Games, an album by Larry Fast
 Games, an EP by Claire, or the title song

Songs
 "Game" (BoA song)
 "Game", a song by Ayumi Hamasaki, the B-side of the single Inspire
 "Game", a song by Doja Cat from her 2018 album Amala
 "Games" (Chuckii Booker song), 1992
 "Games" (Luke Bryan song), 2015
 "Games" (New Kids on the Block song), 1991
 "Games", a song by Demi Lovato from her 2017 album Tell Me You Love Me
 "Games", a song by The Strokes from their 2011 album Angles
 "Games", a song by Cher from her 1982 album I Paralyze, later covered by Tina Turner
 "Games", a song by the Jonas Brothers from Jonas Brothers
 "Game", a song by Jme from his 2015 album Integrity>
 "Games", a song by Tessa Violet from her 2019 album Bad Ideas

Periodicals
 Games (magazine), an American game and puzzle magazine
 GamesTM, a magazine

Television
"Games" (House), a 2007 episode of House
"Games" (seaQuest DSV), a 1993 episode of seaQuest DSV

Brands and enterprises
 Game (retailer), a major British video game retailer
 Game, a South African general retailer, operated by Massmart (a subsidiary of Wal-Mart)

Mathematics and science
 Game, a strategic interaction between individuals, in game theory
 Games, a mathematical superset of surreal numbers
 Game, a common counterproductive social interaction in transactional analysis
Simulation video game, a simulation or reenactment undertaken for training, analysis, or prediction

Other uses
 Game (grape), also known as Gamé, another name for the wine grape Blaufränkisch
 Georgia Academy of Mathematics, Engineering and Science, an early college entrance program
 Ludi Romani, or Roman Games, a religious festival in ancient Rome
 Mind games, a form of covert psychological influence

See also
 Gamble (disambiguation)
 Game Over (disambiguation)
 Gamer (disambiguation)
 Gaming (disambiguation)
 Let the Game Begin
 Let the Games Begin (disambiguation)
 Summer Games (disambiguation)
 The Game (disambiguation)
 Video game
 Video Games (disambiguation)
 Winter games (disambiguation)